Golden Corn (1919 - 1935), was an English-bred, throughbred filly horse who was one of the top rated two-year-olds of 1921.  Her wins in 1921 included The Middle Park Stakes. She stayed in training for three seasons, adding the July Cup in 1923. As a brood mare she had a number of winners, including Cornbelt, winner of the John Porter Stakes.

Breeding

Golden Corn was highly bred, particularly on her dam side, which included several important racehorses of the late Victorian era, including the Triple Crown winner Isinglass, an Ascot Gold Cup winner in Isonomy and the undefeated St Simon.
Her sire St Frusquin was the top two-year-old of 1895 when his five wins included the Middle Park Plate and the Dewhurst Plate. Her sire's breeding proved dominant as Golden Corn excelled as a two-year-old at five and six furlongs.

Racing

Golden Corn, who was originally registered with the name Maize, was a bay or brown filly with a white blaze on her face and two white socks. She was trained at Newmarket by Hugh Powney and Cecil Boyd-Rochfort, later trainer to Her Majesty Queen Elizabeth II. Her owner was Marshall Field III an American investment banker. She was outstanding as a two-year-old, winning all her starts bar one and was rated top of her generation in 1921. Her successes that year included the Champagne Stakes at Doncaster and the Middle Park Stakes at Newmarket. Her three-year-old career was underwhelming. She ran third in the fillies classic, the 1000 Guineas at Newmarket, apparently failing to stay the distance of one mile. She stayed in training as a four-year-old, adding the July Cup at Newmarket to her victories.

As brood mare 

Golden Corn had some success as a brood mare, including Cornbelt, winner of the John Porter Stakes at Newbury. She was also dam of Cross of Gold, sent to the United States and herself dam of six winners including Camelot, the dam of the Kentucky Oaks' winner Blue Grass, also owned by Marshal Field III

She was painted by  Lynwood Palmer.

Notes

References

1919 racehorse births
1935 racehorse deaths
Racehorses bred in the United Kingdom
Racehorses trained in the United Kingdom
Thoroughbred family 4-c